The Lawless Legion is a 1929 American silent Western film directed by Harry Joe Brown and written by Bennett Cohen, Fred Allen and Leslie Mason. The film stars Ken Maynard, Nora Lane, Paul Hurst, J. P. McGowan, Frank Rice and Howard Truesdale. The film was released by Warner Bros. on February 17, 1929.

Cast    
 Ken Maynard as Cal Stanley
 Nora Lane as Mary
 Paul Hurst as Ramirez
 J. P. McGowan as Matson
 Frank Rice as Flapjack
 Howard Truesdale as Sheriff Keiver
 Tarzan as Tarzan

References

External links
 

1929 films
1929 Western (genre) films
First National Pictures films
Films directed by Harry Joe Brown
American black-and-white films
Silent American Western (genre) films
1920s English-language films
1920s American films